Amt Wusterwitz is an Amt ("collective municipality") in the district of Potsdam-Mittelmark, in Brandenburg, Germany. Its seat is in Wusterwitz.

The Amt Wusterwitz consists of the following municipalities:
Bensdorf
Rosenau
Wusterwitz

Demography

References
 

Wusterwitz
Potsdam-Mittelmark